Sarab-e Sarin (also Romanized as Sarāb-e Sarīn; also known as Sarīn and Sīrīn) is a village in Osmanvand Rural District, Firuzabad District, Kermanshah County, Kermanshah Province, Iran. At the 2006 census, its population was 199, in 45 families.

References 

Populated places in Kermanshah County